Parliamentary elections were held in Portugal on 13 June 1915. The result was a victory for the Democratic Party, which won 106 of the 163 seats in the Chamber of Deputies and 45 of the 69 seats in the Senate.

Results

Notes

References

Legislative elections in Portugal
1915 elections in Europe
1915 elections in Portugal
June 1915 events